DTS-HD Master Audio (DTS-HD MA; known as DTS++ before 2004) is a multi-channel, lossless audio codec developed by DTS as an extension of the lossy DTS Coherent Acoustics codec (DTS CA; usually itself referred to as just DTS). Rather than being an entirely new coding mechanism, DTS-HD MA encodes an audio master in lossy DTS first, then stores a concurrent stream of supplementary data representing whatever the DTS encoder discarded. This gives DTS-HD MA a lossy "core" able to be played back by devices that cannot decode the more complex lossless audio. DTS-HD MA's primary application is audio storage and playback for Blu-ray Disc media; it competes in this respect with Dolby TrueHD, another lossless surround format. DTS-HD MA has enjoyed the greater share of this market since 2010, with the notable exception of the TrueHD-encoded Dolby Atmos spatial surround format, which is more popular than DTS's competing DTS:X (encoded with DTS-HD MA).

Specifications 
DTS-HD MA can store up to 8 discrete channels of audio (7.1 surround) at up to a 24 bit sample depth and 192 kHz sampling frequency (96 kHz for 6.1 or 7.1 surround). Although DTS-HD MA, and the related DTS-HD, allow virtually any number of channels in the abstract, these limits are imposed for practical reasons of limited storage and bitrate availability. A DTS-HD MA bitstream may have a bitrate no greater than 24.5 Mbit/s (instantaneous), of which no greater than 1.5 Mbit/s may be lossy DTS (as per the DTS CA specification).

The Blu-ray specification stipulates DTS-HD MA as an optional codec, which means that some Blu-ray hardware may not decode it. This is the reason for the bifurcated nature of a DTS-HD MA audio stream; DTS CA, unlike its MA extension, is mandatory, so a player that is not MA-capable can automatically default to an MA-encoded disc's base DTS stream and simply ignore the supplementary data. Alternatively, even if a player is MA-capable, the base stream may be needed for backward compatibility with an older AV receiver (for example, one manufactured during the DVD era).

DTS-HD MA is the encoding format for DTS:X, an object-based surround-sound format that competes with Dolby Atmos. A DTS-HD MA bitstream carrying DTS:X can contain up to 9 simultaneous sound objects, which are dynamically mapped to a user's speaker system during playback, unlike the rigid number and placement of speakers required by channel-based surround (a DTS marketing executive referred to DTS:X in an interview as "whatever.1").

Encoding process 
DTS-HD MA is encoded in three steps. First, the audio master is fed to a DTS CA encoder, which generates the core (lossy) audio stream. Next, this lossy audio is decoded and compared to the master, with "residual" data being recorded wherever the two differ. Finally, the residual data is compressed losslessly and merged with the core into one bitstream. A DTS-HD MA decoder simply performs this process in reverse.

DTS-HD MA audio, including DTS:X audio, can be created and edited using DTS's DTS:X Encoder Suite. The DTS-HD Master Audio Suite served the same function before the introduction of DTS:X, and can still be used for DTS-HD MA that does not carry DTS:X.

AV transport 
DTS-HD Master Audio may be transported to AV receivers in 5.1, 6.1, or 7.1 channels, in full quality, in one of three ways depending on player and/or receiver support:
Over 6, 7 or 8 RCA connectors as analog audio, using the player's internal decoder and digital-to-analog converter (DAC).
Over HDMI 1.1 (or higher) connections as 6-, 7-, or 8-channel linear PCM, using the player's decoder and the AV receiver's DAC.
Over HDMI 1.3 (or higher) connections as the original DTS-HD Master Audio bitstream, with decoding and DAC both done by the AV receiver. (This is the transport mode required for DTS:X playback.)
S/PDIF does not have the bandwidth to carry DTS-HD MA (or PCM in more than 2 channels). A setup using S/PDIF audio may output DTS-HD MA as either lossy DTS (which S/PDIF can carry) or downmixed stereo PCM.

References 

Blu-ray Disc
HD DVD
Lossless audio codecs
Surround sound